Hometown is a  census-designated place (CDP) located along the Kanawha River on West Virginia Route 62 in Putnam County, West Virginia, United States. As of the 2010 census, its population was 668. Hometown has six streets that are intersected by one street. There is an elementary school. The red house on the left in the photo was constructed for Thomas M. Brown and Ella Mae Criner Brown in the early 1920s, and was the first house built at Hometown.

Gallery

References

Census-designated places in Putnam County, West Virginia
Census-designated places in West Virginia
Charleston, West Virginia metropolitan area
Populated places on the Kanawha River